Knox County is a county located in the U.S. state of Texas. As of the 2020 census, its population was 3,353. Its county seat is Benjamin. The county was created in 1858 and later organized in 1886. It is named for Henry Knox, an American Revolutionary War general.

Geography

Major highways
    U.S. Highway 82/State Highway 114
  U.S. Highway 277
  State Highway 6
  State Highway 222

Adjacent counties
 Foard County (north)
 Baylor County (east)
 Haskell County (south)
 King County (west)
 Stonewall County (southwest)
 Throckmorton County (southeast)

Notable geographic features
 The Narrows

Demographics

Note: the US Census treats Hispanic/Latino as an ethnic category. This table excludes Latinos from the racial categories and assigns them to a separate category. Hispanics/Latinos can be of any race.

As of the census of 2000,  4,253 people, 1,690 households, and 1,166 were families residing in the county.  The population density was 5 people/sq mi (2/km2).  The 2,129 housing units had an average density of 2/sq mi (1/km2).  The racial makeup of the county was 74.35% White, 6.91% African American, 1.08% Native American, 0.24% Asian, 0.09% Pacific Islander, 14.77% from other races, and 2.56% from two or more races. About  25.09% of the population was Hispanic or Latino of any race.

Of the 1,690 households, 30.7% had children under  18 living with them, 56.0% were married couples living together, 9.9% had a female householder with no husband present, and 31.0% were not families. About 29.6% of all households were made up of individuals, and 17.9% had someone living alone who was 65 or older.  The average household size was 2.44, and the average family size was 3.02.

In the county, the age distribution was 27.7% under the age of 18, 5.6% from 18 to 24, 22.9% from 25 to 44, 21.0% from 45 to 64, and 22.7% who were 65  or older.  The median age was 40 years. For every 100 females, there were 89.40 males.  For every 100 females age 18 and over, there were 87.80 males.

The median income for a household in the county was $25,453, and for a family was $30,602. Males had a median income of $25,571 versus $20,865 for females. The per capita income for the county was $13,443.  About 17.1% of families and 22.9% of the population were below the poverty line, including 35.2% of those under age 18 and 15.2% of those age 65 or over.

Education
These school districts serve Knox County:
 Benjamin Independent School District (ISD)
 Crowell ISD (mostly in Foard County; small portion in King County)
 Knox City-O'Brien Consolidated ISD (partly in Haskell County)
 Munday Consolidated ISD (small portions in Haskell and Throckmorton counties)
 Seymour ISD (mostly in Baylor County)

Goree Independent School District formerly served sections of the county. On July 1, 2003 it merged into Munday CISD.

The county is in the service area of Vernon College.

Bobby Boatright Memorial Music Camp

The city of Goree in Knox County is the site of the annual Bobby Boatright Memorial Music Camp, an event for aspiring Western Swing musicians of all ages to showcase their musical talents.  The camp's namesake was a fiddle player who was originally from Goree.  The camp was profiled in a story that aired on July 21, 2010, on National Public Radio's Morning Edition program.

Communities

Cities
 Benjamin (county seat)
 Goree
 Munday

Town
 Knox City

Unincorporated communities
 Rhineland
 Truscott
 Vera

Politics
Knox County is represented in the Texas House of Representatives by the Republican James Frank, a businessman from Wichita Falls. The 1932 Texas Republican gubernatorial nominee, Orville Bullington, resided in Knox County and served as county attorney early in his career.

See also

 Dry counties
 National Register of Historic Places listings in Knox County, Texas
 Recorded Texas Historic Landmarks in Knox County

References

External links
 Knox County, Texas - Official site.
 

 
1886 establishments in Texas
Populated places established in 1886